AD 11 (XI) was a common year starting on Thursday (link will display the full calendar) of the Julian calendar. At the time, it was known as the Year of the Consulship of Lepidus and Taurus (or, less frequently, year 764 Ab urbe condita). The denomination AD 11 for this year has been used since the early medieval period, when the Anno Domini calendar era became the prevalent method in Europe for naming years.

Events

By place

Roman Empire 
 Germania Inferior and the Rhine are secured by Germanicus.
 Emperor Augustus abandons his plan to create a defensive border at the Elbe, in order to reinforce the Roman defenses along the Rhine and the Danube.
 An edict is issued effecting an empire-wide ban on divinatory practices, especially astrology. The edict requires any consultation between a customer and a practitioner to be conducted with at least one third party witness present, and bans inquiry into anyone's death.

Persia 
 Artabanus II becomes ruler of Parthia.

India 
 Satakarni begins his reign as Emperor of the Andhra Empire (AD 11–29).

China 
 The yellow river experiences a major flood. This flood is credited for the downfall of the short-lived Xin dynasty.

Births

Deaths 
 Marcus Antistius Labeo, prominent Roman jurist

References 

 

als:10er#11